Xdinary Heroes is a South Korean rock band under JYP Entertainment's sub-label, Studio J. They officially debuted on December 6, 2021, with the single "Happy Death Day". The band consists of six members: Gunil, Jungsu, Gaon, O.de, Jun Han, and Jooyeon. All of the members are involved in writing, composing, and producing the music of the band. The band's name is shortened form of "Extraordinary Heroes", meaning "anyone can become a hero".

History

2021: Formation and debut with "Happy Death Day"
On November 1, JYP Entertainment released a teaser titled "Heroes Are Coming" hinting at a new group to debut. A week later, on November 8, the logo and name of the group were revealed and the group's official social media accounts were launched. Jooyeon was officially announced as the group's first member, followed by O.de, Gaon, Jun Han, Jungsu, and Gunil from November 15–20. On November 22–27, teasers were released revealing the positions of the members, starting with Jooyeon playing the bass on November 22, followed by O.de playing the synthesizer on the November 23, Gaon playing the electric guitar on the November 24, Jun Han playing the electric guitar on the November 25, Jungsu on the keyboard on the November 26, and Gunil playing the drums on the November 27. It was revealed that Jungsu and O.de initially trained to be in a K-pop group, but were later told they would be in a band.

On December 6, Xdinary Heroes debuted with the single "Happy Death Day". The song debuted at number 12 on the Billboard World Digital Song Sales.

2022: Hello, World! and Overload
On June 28, 2022, Xdinary Heroes announced they would be releasing their first extended play Hello, World! on July 20.

On September 16, the band announced their second extended play Overload, to be released on November 4. On October 19, the group announced their first solo concert "Stage ♭ : Overture" would be held on December 16-18. On October 30, it announced that Overload release would be postponed due to the national mourning period following the Itaewon Halloween crowd crush incident that happened a day earlier. On November 6, JYP Entertainment announced the group would be releasing Overload on November 11. The EP debuted at number 14 on the Billboard World Albums Chart.

Members

List of members and roles.
 Gunil – leader, drums, vocals 
 Jungsu – vocals, keyboard
 Gaon – rap, vocals, guitar
 O.de – rap, vocals, synthesizer, keyboard
 Jun Han – guitar, vocals
 Jooyeon – vocals, bass

Discography

Extended plays

Singles

Other charted songs

Compilation album appearances

Videography

Music videos

Filmography

Web shows

Concerts

Headlining concerts

Awards and nominations

Notes

References

External links

2021 establishments in South Korea
JYP Entertainment artists
K-pop music groups
Musical groups established in 2021
Musical groups from Seoul
South Korean rock music groups
South Korean pop rock music groups